Vazmela (also Romanized as Vazmelā and Vez Mollā) is a village in Banaft Rural District, Dodangeh District, Sari County, Mazandaran Province, Iran. At the 2006 census, its population was 148, in 40 families.

References 

Populated places in Sari County